Wester (in its upper course: Wideybach) is a 14-km long river, a southern tributary of Möhne of North Rhine-Westphalia, Germany. It flows between the Warstein and Belecke subdivisions of the town of Warstein.

See also
List of rivers of North Rhine-Westphalia

References

Rivers of North Rhine-Westphalia
Rivers of Germany